Loberus is a genus of pleasing fungus beetles in the family Erotylidae. There are about 16 described species in Loberus.

Species
These 16 species belong to the genus Loberus:

 Loberus aeratus Bruce, 1953
 Loberus anthracinus (Broun, 1893)
 Loberus borealis Leschen, 2003
 Loberus depressus (Sharp, 1876)
 Loberus imbellis Casey, 1900
 Loberus impressus LeConte, 1863
 Loberus insularis Casey
 Loberus javanensis Bruce, 1954
 Loberus marginicollis (Grouvelle, 1913)
 Loberus nitens (Sharp, 1876)
 Loberus ornatus Schaeffer, 1904
 Loberus puberulus Casey
 Loberus subglaber Casey, 1900
 Loberus testaceus Reitter, 1875
 Loberus vitraci Grouvelle, 1902
 Loberus watti Leschen, 2003

References

Further reading

External links

 

Erotylidae
Articles created by Qbugbot